Kandrykul (Qandrakül) is a rural locality (a selo) in Nikolayevsky Selsoviet, Tuymazinsky District, Bashkortostan, Russia. The population was 547 as of 2010. There are 2 streets.

Geography 
Kandrykul is located 30 km southeast of Tuymazy (the district's administrative centre) by road. Kandry-Tyumekeyevo is the nearest rural locality.

References 

Rural localities in Tuymazinsky District